Charles Anthony Boyd (August 17, 1959 – August 5, 1999), also known as The Bathroom Slayer, was an American serial killer. Between 1986 and 1987, Boyd committed the rape and murders of three women in North Dallas. Tried for one of the murders, he was convicted and sentenced to death. Boyd was later executed by lethal injection in 1999, at the Huntsville Unit.

Early life 
A native of Dallas, prior to the murders, Boyd was sentenced to five years in prison for sexual assault and burglary. He was later granted early release in November 1985, after serving less than half of his sentence, after which he got a job as a janitor at a nearby bank. From July to September 1986, Boyd lived with his brother at his brother's apartment.

Murders 
Boyd committed his first murder on July 22, 1986, when 37-year-old Tippawan Nakusan, a Thai immigrant who lived in the apartment just upstairs of his and worked as a waitress, was found stabbed and suffocated to death in her bathtub. On September 15, 1986, an apartment cleaning lady chanced upon 22-year-old Lashun Thomas laying dead in her apartment bathroom. She had been fatally stabbed to death. 

On April 13, 1987, 20-year-old Linda Williams returned home to her apartment from work and found her roommate, 21-year-old Mary Milligan’s body stuffed in a bathtub, raped, strangled, and drowned. While investigating police assumed her killer was the same one who killed Naksuwan and Thomas, by that time locals and the media had applied the pseudonym of "The Bathroom Slayings" to the string of murders. While observing the scene of Milligan’s murder, it was found that some items had been stolen from the apartment. Milligan’s car, a 1982 Cadillac was also reported to be stolen from the complex’s parking lot. It was later found abandoned.

Trial and conviction 
The next day, Boyd was arrested after being found in possession of Milligan’s personal items, some of which he was trying to pawn. Subsequently, a blood and hair test left at the scene exposed Boyd’s involvement. After his arrest, he confessed to all three killings. In late April, Boyd was charged with the murders of Nakusan, Thomas and Milligan. Despite this, and his confession, prosecutors opened the trial in early October with him only being faced with a conviction for the killing of Milligan, because it contained forensic evidence. 

He was indicted on a capital murder charge for killing Milligan, and because he had admitted to the killing, his defense claimed he was mentally retarded, and therefore could not be given a death sentence. His lawyers contested Boyd had a reported IQ of 67, but another prison file listed his IQ as being 80. After 10 minutes of deliberating, the jury reached a guilty verdict for Boyd in November 1987, and a month later they sentenced him to death.

Execution 
On August 5, 1999, Boyd was executed by lethal injection in the execution chamber at the Huntsville Unit. Prior to his execution, he was asked if he would like to make a final statement, for which he declined. When the drugs took effect, however, he claimed out of the blue that he was innocent; "I want you all to know I did not do this crime. I wanted to wait for a thirty day stay for a DNA test so you know who did the crime." Not long after, Boyd let out a gasp and went silent. He was pronounced dead at 6:16 p.m.

See also 
 Capital punishment in Texas
 Capital punishment in the United States
 List of people executed by lethal injection
 List of people executed in Texas, 1990–1999
 List of serial killers in the United States

External links 
 The Skeptical Juror: The Slam Dunk Case of Charles Anthony Boyd

References 

1959 births
1986 murders in the United States
1999 deaths
20th-century American criminals
20th-century executions by Texas
20th-century executions of American people
American male criminals
American prisoners sentenced to life imprisonment
American rapists
Criminals from Texas
Executed American serial killers
Male serial killers
People executed by Texas by lethal injection
People executed for murder
People from Dallas